Jerome Napoleon Bonaparte II (November 5, 1830 – September 3, 1893) was a French-American military officer who served in the United States Army and later in the French Army. He was a member of the American branch of the Bonaparte family.

Early life 
He was born in Baltimore, Maryland on November 5, 1830. He was the eldest son of the French-American Jérôme Napoléon Bonaparte (1805–1870) and his wife, the former Susan May Williams (1812–1881). His younger brother was Charles Joseph Bonaparte, who served as the United States Attorney General and Secretary of the Navy under Theodore Roosevelt.

His paternal grandparents were Jérôme Bonaparte, who reigned as King of Westphalia from 1807 to 1813, and his first wife, the American socialite and successful businesswoman Elizabeth Patterson Bonaparte. Through his grandfather, he was the grandnephew of Emperor Napoleon, who died in 1821.  His maternal grandparents were Sarah (née Copeland) Morton Williams and Benjamin Williams, who helped found the Baltimore and Ohio Railroad, the first railroad company in the United States.

Bonaparte entered the United States Military Academy at West Point in 1848 and graduated 11th in the Class of 1852.

Career
Upon graduation, he was commissioned as a second lieutenant and served in Texas with the Regiment of Mounted Riflemen.

Bonaparte resigned from the U.S. Army in August 1854 to serve in the army of his first cousin-once-removed, Emperor Napoleon III.  A few weeks later, he was commissioned as a lieutenant of dragoons in the French Army. He fought in the Crimean War, Algeria, the Italian campaign, and the Franco-Prussian War, rising to the rank of lieutenant colonel. For his services, he was the recipient of the decoration of the Medjidie Order from Abdulmejid I, the Sultan of Turkey, the Crimea Medal from the Queen of England, and was made a knight of the Légion d'honneur.

Following the Siege of Paris, Bonaparte left the French Army and returned home to the United States.

Personal life
Upon his return to the United States, he married Caroline Le Roy Appleton Edgar (1840–1911), daughter of Samuel and Julia Appleton, and widow of Newbold Edgar.  Caroline was also the granddaughter of American statesman, Daniel Webster.  Together, they were the parents of two children:

 Louise-Eugénie Bonaparte (1873–1923), who married Count Adam Carl von Moltke-Huitfeld (1864–1944) in 1896 and had issue.
 Jerome Napoleon Charles Bonaparte (1878–1945), who married Blanche Pierce Strebeigh, daughter of Edward and Emily Pierce of Newtonville, Massachusetts, and former wife of Harold Strebeigh of Hewlett, New York, in 1914, no issue.

Had his family not been excluded, he would have been first in line to the Bonaparte succession from 1873, and would have succeeded in 1879.

Bonaparte died on September 3, 1893, in Prides Crossing, Massachusetts.

Legacy
His letters from Fort Inge and Fort Ewell have been preserved by the Maryland Historical Society.

References

External links

Career profile

1830 births
1893 deaths
Jerome Napoleon Bonaparte II
United States Army officers
French military personnel of the Crimean War
French military personnel of the Franco-Prussian War
Jerome Napoleon Bonaparte II
American people of Corsican descent
American expatriates in France
Officiers of the Légion d'honneur
United States Military Academy alumni
Military personnel from Baltimore
Patterson family of Maryland